Kofi Kordzi (born 2 January 1995) is a Ghanaian professional footballer who plays as forward for Legon Cities. He previously played for Accra Hearts of Oak.

Career

Hearts of Oak 
Kordzi played for Royals FC before joining Ghana Premier League giants Hearts of Oak in January 2019, when he signed a three-year deal with the club after impressing on a two-week trial. He made his debut during the 2019 GFA Normalization Special Competition,on 31 March 2019, he played the full time in a 1–0 victory over Dreams FC. On 28 April 2019, he scored his debut goal in the 78th minute of a 2–0 home victory over International Allies. He also scored on 5 May 2019, after scoring the final goal in a 4–0 victory over West African Football Academy. At the end of the competition he played 11 out of 12 league matches and scored 2 goals. On 17 February 2020, Kordzi was named NASCO man of the match after netting a brace against Bechem United including scoring a 93rd-minute goal to grant Hearts a 3–2 home victory. That season, the 2019–20 season, he played in 14 league matches and scored 6 goals before the league was cancelled due to the outbreak of the COVID-19 pandemic in Ghana, ending his season as the club's top goalscorer.

Muaither 
In October 2020, Kordzi joined Qatari club Muaither SC ahead of the 2020–21 Qatargas League season for a reported transfer fee of $150,000, with a 20% onward transfer fee going for Hearts of Oak. On 29 November 2020 During his debut, he scored a goal in the 90th minute to help them salvage a 2–2 draw against Al Shahania. At the end of his first season with the club, he played 22 matches and scored 8 goals.

Honours 
Hearts of Oak

 President's Cup: 2022
 Ghanaian FA Cup: 2022

References

External links 
 
 

Living people
1995 births
Ghanaian footballers
Association football forwards
Accra Hearts of Oak S.C. players
Muaither SC players
Ghana Premier League players
Qatari Second Division players
Ghanaian expatriate footballers
Ghanaian expatriate sportspeople in Qatar
Expatriate footballers in Qatar
Ghana A' international footballers
2022 African Nations Championship players